Streptomyces daghestanicus is a bacterium species from the genus of Streptomyces which has been isolated from soil in Daghestan in Russia. Streptomyces daghestanicus produces etamycin.

See also 
 List of Streptomyces species

References

Further reading

External links
Type strain of Streptomyces daghestanicus at BacDive -  the Bacterial Diversity Metadatabase

daghestanicus
Bacteria described in 1958